OSG may refer to:

 Office of the Solicitor General of the Philippines
 Office of the Solicitor General of the United States
 Office of the Surgeon General of the United States
 Oklahoma State Guard, active during World War II
 On-site generation of electrical power
 One Scotland Gazetteer, the definitive national land, property and address dataset for Scotland 
 Open Science Grid, a worldwide collection of technological resources
 OpenSceneGraph, a 3D graphics programming interface
 Operational Studies Group, a publisher of wargames related primarily to the Napoleonic Wars
 Overseas Shipholding Group